The Doyles River is a  tributary of the Moormans River in central Virginia in the United States.  Via the Moormans, Rivanna and James rivers, it is part of the watershed of Chesapeake Bay.

According to the Geographic Names Information System, the river has also been known as the Doyle River.  The United States Board on Geographic Names settled on "Doyles River" as the stream's official name in 1933.

Course
The Doyles River flows for its entire length in northwestern Albemarle County.

See also
List of Virginia rivers

Sources

DeLorme (2005).  Virginia Atlas & Gazetteer.  Yarmouth, Maine: DeLorme.  .

Rivers of Virginia
Tributaries of the James River
Rivers of Albemarle County, Virginia